Brian P. Burke (born June 30, 1955) is an American-Canadian ice hockey executive and former analyst serving as president of hockey operations for the Pittsburgh Penguins of the National Hockey League (NHL). He has also served as the general manager of the Hartford Whalers, Vancouver Canucks, Anaheim Ducks (with whom he won the Stanley Cup in 2007) and Toronto Maple Leafs, as well as president of hockey operations for the Calgary Flames. Burke was also the general manager for the United States national men's ice hockey team for the 2010 Winter Olympics in Vancouver, and is a member of Rugby Canada's board of directors. Burke was inducted into the Rhode Island Hockey Hall of Fame in 2019.

Early life and playing career 
Born in Providence, Rhode Island, and raised in Edina, Minnesota, in a family of ten children, Burke graduated from Edina High School followed by Providence College in 1977 with a Bachelor of Arts degree in history. While attending Providence, he played for the Friars Division-I ice hockey team, where, during his senior year, he served as captain. The team was coached by Lou Lamoriello. He was a teammate with Ron Wilson at Providence.

In 1977, Burke played seven games with the Springfield Indians of the American Hockey League (AHL). He then signed with the Philadelphia Flyers in the offseason and proceeded to play one full year in the AHL with the Maine Mariners, who won the AHL Calder Cup championship that year. After one year in the AHL, Burke attended Harvard Law School, where he graduated with a Juris Doctor in 1981. After graduating, Burke became an NHL player agent.

Executive career

Early career 
In 1987, he was hired by Pat Quinn to be the director of hockey operations for the Vancouver Canucks. In the 1992–93 season, he left that job to become general manager of the Hartford Whalers. Burke stepped down after one year in Hartford, so he could join the NHL front office as executive vice president and director of hockey operations, under league commissioner Gary Bettman. In that role, he served as the league's chief disciplinarian.

Vancouver Canucks 

In 1998, he became general manager of the Vancouver Canucks. With the Canucks, he was credited with reviving the ailing franchise and increasing attendance, with the drafting and signing of several key players such as Daniel Sedin, Henrik Sedin and Ryan Kesler, as the team won a playoff series and captured a division title. Following the 2003–04 NHL season, Canucks ownership chose not to renew Burke's contract for the GM position. Burke then briefly worked as an analyst for NHL games on both CBC and TSN. Burke's total record with the Canucks was 219-181-68-24.

Criticism
Brian Burke faced public criticism for his treatment of forward Peter Zezel.   Zezel had requested that he be traded to an East Coast team in order to be closer to Toronto so that he could see his 5-year old niece who had terminal cancer.  Instead, Burke sent Zezel to the Anaheim Ducks, the NHL city furthest away from Toronto.   As a result, Zezel retired from the NHL.   Only after public and media outcry did Burke decide to buyout Zezel's contract.

Anaheim Ducks 
As the 2004-05 NHL Lockout was coming to a close, Burke was announced as the next GM of the Anaheim Ducks. In his first year with the club, the Ducks made it all the way to the third round before falling to the Edmonton Oilers in the Western Conference Final. The following year, Burke won the Stanley Cup with the Anaheim Ducks in the 2006–07 NHL season. Burke stepped down as GM of the Anaheim Ducks on November 12, 2008. The Ducks management submitted papers to the NHL, releasing him from contractual commitment.

Toronto Maple Leafs 
On November 29, 2008, Burke was introduced as the president and general manager of the Toronto Maple Leafs, replacing interim general manager Cliff Fletcher. He became the 13th non-interim general manager of the club and the first to be American-born. He reportedly agreed to a six-year deal worth $3 million annually. Soon thereafter, on December 4, 2008, Burke offered Dave Nonis the position of senior vice president and director of hockey operations for the Maple Leafs; Nonis accepted, marking the third time he has held this post under Burke; he had done so previously in Anaheim and Vancouver.

Burke attended the World Hockey Summit hosted in Toronto in 2010, and wanted NHL participation in the Winter Olympics to continue, but felt that teams should receive financial compensation while the NHL season was on hiatus during the Olympics. He proposed allowing the NHL oversee a world championship which had potential to a financially lucrative venture while league games were not being played.

On January 9, 2013, Burke was fired by the Leafs as president and general manager and given a role as senior advisor to MLSE's president and C.O.O. Tom Anselmi and the MLSE board of directors. The advisory role would not relate to hockey matters. Burke was fired principally by team director George A. Cope, who campaigned the team's new ownership to make a change in team leadership. During Burke's tenure with the Leafs from November 2008 to January 2013, the team consistently failed to make the post-season and remained the only team in the League that was unable to do so following the 2004 lockout. With the Leafs, Burke amassed a record of 129-135-42.

Criticism

During his time in Toronto, Burke was notably criticized for a controversial trade in 2009  with Boston, when he acquired sniper Phil Kessel for two first-round draft picks and a second-round selection. The Bruins used the picks to select star forward Tyler Seguin, Dougie Hamilton and Jared Knight.

In December 2011, Burke drew criticism in the media for his mid-season extension of head coach Ron Wilson, a longtime friend. "Burke and Wilson were born a month apart, were college roommates and teammates on the Providence College Friars hockey team in Rhode Island in the 1970s and have been friends ever since. Despite Wilson's three consecutive losing seasons, Burke renewed Wilson's contract with a $2 million extension. News of the contract broke on social media site Twitter, where Wilson posted that "This Xmas could be better if Santa stuffs a certain piece of paper in my stocking" and "'He came! He came!' [...] I got a new Red Ryder BB gun and a contract extension!", to which Burke replied, "Congratulations to Ron Wilson on his contract extension! Merry Christmas Ron!" Later, Burke defended his decision in the media, stating "This is a coach who's earned this, a coach who's earned this extension," and "It's not charity. It's not a gift." However, Wilson was released with full pay three months later following mounting losses and jeers from fans. "Every coach has a shelf life," Burke said. "After the last home game, it would be cruel and unusual punishment to let Ron coach another game in the Air Canada Centre."

Calgary Flames 

On September 5, 2013, Burke was named the president of hockey operations for the Calgary Flames, a position in only three NHL team organizations — Calgary, the Columbus Blue Jackets, and the Edmonton Oilers. A president of hockey operations is not to be confused with a team's president. A president of hockey operations sits between president (or owner) and general manager within a club's hierarchy. It is an advisory position assuming little to no direct responsibility for team decisions.  After firing Jay Feaster and John Weisbrod, Burke assumed the role of acting general manager during the search for a permanent GM. On April 28, 2014, Burke hired Brad Treliving as the GM of the Calgary Flames.

After nearly five years on the job, Burke stepped back from his role as president of the Flames' hockey operations on April 27, 2018.

Pittsburgh Penguins 
On February 9, 2021, Burke was hired as the President of Hockey Operations for the Pittsburgh Penguins.

Broadcasting career 
Following his departure from the Calgary Flames, Burke joined Rogers Media as an ice hockey analyst during the 2018 Stanley Cup playoffs in April 2018. He worked as a hockey analyst with Sportsnet and on Hockey Night in Canada until his hiring by the Pittsburgh Penguins in February 2021.

In October 2020, Burke in collaboration with Stephen Brunt released a memoir about Burke's life entitled “Burke’s Law”.

Personal life 
A dual citizen of the United States and Canada, Burke has two daughters with ex-wife Jennifer Mather Burke, an anchor at CTV News Channel. One of his daughters Katie was married to baseball executive Jared Porter until 2014.

Burke also has four children from a previous marriage, including Patrick, a former scout for the Philadelphia Flyers and as of 2015 a director in the NHL's Department of Player Safety. Burke is a strong supporter of gay rights and attended the 2009 Toronto Gay Pride Parade with his son Brendan Burke, who was gay.
On February 5, 2010, Brendan died at age 21 from injuries suffered in a car accident in Indiana.
Brian Burke also participated in the 2010 and 2011 Toronto Gay Pride parades. On March 4, 2012, Burke and his son Patrick launched the You Can Play project in honor of Brendan, which is targeted at ending homophobia in sports.

Defamation lawsuit filed against anonymous posters 
On April 26, 2013, Burke filed a lawsuit against 18 individuals who had anonymously posted on websites that the actual reason Burke was fired from the Maple Leafs was for allegedly having an affair with a female sportscaster and fathering her child. Burke said the claims were false and defamatory. He sued to seek court orders disclosing the names of those who posted the accusations.

Burke was able to achieve a minor victory in the Supreme Court of British Columbia, which ruled that anonymous defendants could be served notice of the proceedings through the private messaging on the message boards they had used to make the statements about Burke. , Burke and his legal team had tracked down the identities of several of the individuals and forced them to make retractions.

Notes

References

External links 

 
Brian Burke's trades as GM of the Maple Leafs
Brian Burke's trades as GM of the Ducks
Brian Burke's trades as GM of the Canucks
Brian Burke's trades as GM of the Flames

1955 births
American expatriate ice hockey people in Canada
American men's ice hockey forwards
American lawyers
American sports announcers
Anaheim Ducks executives
Anaheim Ducks scouts
Calgary Flames executives
Edina High School alumni
Hartford Whalers executives
Harvard Law School alumni
Ice hockey people from Minnesota
Ice hockey people from Rhode Island
Ice hockey people from Providence, Rhode Island
Lester Patrick Trophy recipients
Canadian LGBT rights activists
American LGBT rights activists
Living people
Maine Mariners players
National Hockey League executives
Pittsburgh Penguins executives
Providence Friars men's ice hockey players
Sportspeople from Edina, Minnesota
Sportspeople from Providence, Rhode Island
Springfield Indians players
Stanley Cup champions
Toronto Maple Leafs executives
Vancouver Canucks executives
Vancouver Canucks general managers